Jin Pyol-hui  (born 19 August 1980,) is a North Korean former women's international footballer who played as a forward. She was a member of the North Korea women's national football team. She was part of the team at the 1999 FIFA Women's World Cup and 2003 FIFA Women's World Cup.

International goals

References

1980 births
Living people
North Korean women's footballers
North Korea women's international footballers
Place of birth missing (living people)
1999 FIFA Women's World Cup players
2003 FIFA Women's World Cup players
Women's association football forwards
Footballers at the 1998 Asian Games
Footballers at the 2002 Asian Games
Asian Games gold medalists for North Korea
Asian Games silver medalists for North Korea
Asian Games medalists in football
Medalists at the 1998 Asian Games
Medalists at the 2002 Asian Games